Archibald Watson FRCS (27 July 1849 – 30 July 1940) was an Australian surgeon and professor of anatomy at the University of Adelaide.

Early life
Watson was born at Tarcutta, New South Wales, the son of Sydney Grandison Watson, a retired naval officer who became a squatter on the upper Murray. He was educated at a national school in Sydney and then Scotch College, Melbourne 1861–67, where he was a champion light-weight boxer. As an agent for his father, he arrived in Fiji on 10 March 1871 and was aboard the second voyage of the brig Carl in the Solomon Islands 1871–72 which was involved in blackbirding. The captain of the Carl, Joseph Armstrong, was later sentenced to death for his involvement in the massacre of islanders during the earlier 1871 voyage of the Carl. Upon returning the Fiji Watson was charged with piracy in respect of the second voyage of the Carl, but was later discharged from bail.

Career

Watson met Baron Ferdinand von Mueller and was advised to take up a scientific career, Watson went to Europe to study medicine, obtaining the degrees of M.D., University of Göttingen, M.D., University of Paris, and F.R.C.S., England. After doing post-graduate work at Paris he was for some time demonstrator of anatomy to Professor J. Cantlie at the Charing Cross Hospital medical school.

In 1883 he went to Egypt as surgeon with Hicks Pasha's Sudan force, and in 1885 became first Elder professor of anatomy at the newly founded medical school at Adelaide. He taught also pathology (showing an early interest in biological means of controlling the rabbit pest), surgical anatomy, and operative surgery. He held this position for 34 years. During this time, he was also responsible for the collection of human remains of Indigenous Australians, some of which were shipped to overseas institutions. (In the 21st century, the Museum started pursuing an active policy of repatriation and reburial of these remains.)

During the Boer war he was consulting-surgeon for the Natal field force. When World War I broke out in 1914, though 65 years of age, Watson left Australia with the first expeditionary force as a major in the Royal Australian Army Medical Corps and became consulting-surgeon and pathologist to No. 1 Australian Stationary Hospital at Heliopolis in Egypt. He returned to Australia in 1916.

Watson visited China, South America, Japan, Russia and New Zealand, where he usually watched leading surgeons perform operations; although he regarded Sydney's Sir Alexander MacCormick as superior.

Late life
Watson resigned his university chair at the end of 1919 and spent many years travelling, visiting places as far apart as Iceland and the Falkland Islands. He journeyed round Australia gathering marine specimens and fishing. The 'Archibald Watson Prize' at the University of Adelaide was founded by public subscription in 1935. For the last two years of his life, he lived on Thursday Island where died on 30 July 1940, three days after turning 91. He was unmarried. He is commemorated by a memorial lecture at the invitation of the Royal Australasian College of Surgeons. His portrait (by William Beckwith McInnes) hangs in the Adelaide University's anatomy department.

References

Additional sources listed by the Australian Dictionary of Biography:
Royal Society of South Australia, Transactions, 16, pt 2, 1893; Lone Hand, 1 January 1914; Adelaide University Magazine, 2, no 1, Sept 1919; Medical Journal of Australia, 12 October 1940, p 361, 27 September 1947, p 381, 29 April 1950, p 549; Adelaide Medical Students Society, AMSS Review, Aug 1961, p 19; R. G. Elmslie, 'The Colonial Career of James Patrick Murray', Australian and New Zealand Journal of Surgery, 49, no 1, 1979; Sydney Morning Herald, 20–23 Nov 1872, 1 March 1873, 30 September 1930, 30 July 1936; Observer (Adelaide), 15 February 1896, 20 January 1900, 26 May 1928; News (Adelaide), 31 July 1940; Chronicle (Adelaide), 15 August 1940; GRG 2/5/23, 43 and D5390 [Misc] and PRG 128/12/7 and 30/5/7-9 (State Library of South Australia); Royal Australasian College of Surgeons Archives (Melbourne); Marston collection, folders 33–71, especially MS 1682/65 no 3847-49 (National Library of Australia); Attorney-General and Justice Dept, special bundles, 1836–76, 4/2698B (State Records New South Wales); Land Claims Commission 1875–82, claim no 606, 782 998 (National Archives of Fiji, Suva).

Further reading
Jennifer M. T. Carter, Painting the Islands Vermillion: Archibald Watson and the Brig "Carl", Melbourne, Melbourne University Press, 1999; ; 279 pp;

External links
The Archibald Watson Prize at The University of Adelaide
Archibald Watson Medal and Lecture at the Royal Australasian College of Surgeons
Photograph of Watson and students

1849 births
1940 deaths
Australian surgeons
Fellows of the Royal College of Surgeons
People educated at Scotch College, Melbourne
People from New South Wales